This is a list of members of the South Australian Legislative Council from 1953 to 1956.

 LCL MLC Reginald Rudall died on 1 January 1955. Ross Story was elected to the vacancy on 26 February.

References
Parliament of South Australia — Statistical Record of the Legislature

Members of South Australian parliaments by term
20th-century Australian politicians